Gymnopilus chrysimyces is a species of mushroom in the family Hymenogastraceae.

Medicinal
In a 1982 study, this species was shown to contain hemagglutinins. Proteins from G. chrysimyces showed activity towards rat erythrocytes, while proteins from Lentinus squarrosulus showed activity towards guinea pig and mouse erythrocytes. The agglutination of proteins from the two species showed that both have more than one hemagglutinin.

See also

List of Gymnopilus species

References

External links
Index Fungorum

chrysimyces